Catoptria harutai is a moth in the family Crambidae. It was described by Okano in 1958. It is found in Japan (Honshu).

References

Crambini
Moths described in 1958
Moths of Japan